Charles Andrews may refer to:
 Charles Andrews (Maine politician) (1814–1852), US Representative from Maine
 Charles Andrews (judge) (1827–1918), Chief Judge of the NY Court of Appeals 1881–1882 and 1893–1897 and Mayor of Syracuse, New York
 Charles Andrews (organist), British organist
 Charles B. Andrews (1834–1902), former Governor of Connecticut
 Charles Freer Andrews (1871–1940), English priest who worked with Mohandas Gandhi
 Charles McLean Andrews (1863–1943), American historian
 Charles O. Andrews (1877–1946), US Senator from Florida
 Charles O. Andrews Jr. (born 1910), American politician
 Charles William Andrews (1866–1924), British palaeontologist

See also
Charles Andrew (1793–1855), English cricketer
Charlie Andrew (born 1980), British record producer
Charlie Andrews (Heroes), fictional character in TV program, Heroes